The Redstone Technical Test Center (RTTC) was one of the eight test centers that comprise the Developmental Test Command of the United States Army Test and Evaluation Command. RTTC conducted flight-testing of small rockets and guided missiles, and performed life cycle testing for weapon components. In October 2010, as part of the Base Reallocation and Closure (BRAC) process, RTTC was combined with the Aviation Technical Test Center from Fort Rucker to form the U.S. Army Redstone Test Center.

Use by NRPTA 
The RTTC has developed a capability for static firing hypergolic liquid rocket engines. RTTC's facilities and procedures may be used for future testing of Army, DoD, NASA, and private industry's liquid rocket engines as part of the National Rocket Propulsion Test Alliance (NRPTA).

References 

Buildings and structures in Madison County, Alabama
Rocket launch sites in the United States
Research installations of the United States Army